Paraperonia is a genus of air-breathing sea slugs, a shell-less marine pulmonate gastropod mollusks in the family Onchidiidae.

Species
Species within the genus Paraperonia include:

 Paraperonia fidjiensis Labbé, 1934
 Paraperonia gondwanae Labbé, 1934
 Paraperonia jousseaumei Labbé, 1934
 Paraperonia madagascariensis Labbé, 1934

References

Onchidiidae